La Correspondencia may refer to:

 La Correspondencia (newspaper), a Puerto Rican newspaper
 , a Spanish newspaper published from 1859 to 1925
 La Correspondencia Militar, a Spanish newspaper published from 1877 to 1932